Lawrence Julian Schiller (born December 28, 1936) is an American photojournalist, film producer, director and screenwriter.

Career

Schiller was born in 1936 in Brooklyn to Jewish parents and grew up outside of San Diego, California. After attending Pepperdine College in Los Angeles, he worked for Life magazine, Paris Match, The Sunday Times, Time, Newsweek, Stern, and The Saturday Evening Post as a freelance photojournalist.  He published his first book, LSD, in 1966. Since then Schiller has published 17 books, including W. Eugene Smith's book Minamata and Norman Mailer's Marilyn. Having produced and directed the 1967 Capitol Records audio documentary album Why Did Lenny Bruce Die?, he collaborated with Albert Goldman on the bestseller in 1974 Ladies and Gentleman--Lenny Bruce!!, and also with Norman Mailer on the 1980 New York Times bestseller and the made-for-television motion picture of The Executioner's Song as well as in 1995 Oswald's Tale. His own books that became national bestsellers and made the New York Times Bestseller list include American Tragedy, Perfect Murder, Perfect Town, Cape May Court House, and Into the Mirror.

He has directed seven motion pictures and miniseries for television; The Executioner's Song and Peter the Great won five Emmys. American Tragedy, Perfect Murder, Perfect Town and Into the Mirror were made into television mini-series for CBS, all of which Schiller produced and directed. In 2008, after the death of the writer Norman Mailer, he was named Senior Advisor to the Norman Mailer Estate. Schiller was a close friend of Mailer and collaborator on five of his works. Schiller also serves on the executive board of the Norman Mailer Society.

Following the June 12, 1994 stabbing deaths of O.J Simpson's ex-wife Nicole Brown Simpson and her friend Ron Goldman, Schiller collaborated with Simpson, who was in jail awaiting his famous murder trial at the time, on a book called I Want to Tell You, which was billed as the former football star answering questions from fans about his life and the incident.  Following Simpson's acquittal on murder charges, Schiller and former Time magazine journalist Jim Willwerth co-wrote American Tragedy: The Uncensored Story of the Simpson Defense, considered one of the best books about the case. Dan Whitcomb, who covered the sensational trial for Reuters, worked for Schiller as a researcher on the book.

In 1999 Schiller published a book on the JonBenet Ramsey murder case, Perfect Murder, Perfect Town: The Uncensored Story of the JonBenet Murder and the Grand Jury's Search for the Final Truth, based on an article he had published in The New Yorker on the same subject.

Schiller served as a consultant to political campaigns and major corporations on such issues as crisis management, branding, public imaging and the use of social networking. Schiller has been an on-air analyst to NBC news, a consultant to Taschen Publishing, The John F. Kennedy Library and Foundation, The Ray Bradbury Estate, Mitsubishi Power Systems Americas, Photographers Annie Leibovitz Studio and Steven Klein and has written for The New Yorker, The Daily Beast and other publications.

In 2005, Schiller traveled to China and over two years built a collection of Chinese contemporary art, which numbers over 80 paintings and photographs. In 2007, he showed his own photographs for the first time in the US at the exhibition Marilyn Monroe and America in the 1960s. It is for these photographs of Marilyn that Schiller is perhaps best known as a photographer. Schiller first photographed Monroe in May 1960 on the set of Let’s Make Love, and then again in 1962 when he was hired to photograph the star on the set of what would become the last film she would ever work on, the unfinished Something’s Got To Give. Marilyn & Me, Schiller's 11th book, commemorates his experience photographing the Hollywood legend, complete with 131 color and black-and-white photographs.  In 2017 Schiller curated the John F. Kennedy Centennial for the Smithsonian American Art Museum in Washington D.C. and the New York Historical Society in New York City. He also now represents the Jacques Lowe Estate of historical photographs of the Kennedy family and the Lisl Steiner photographic archives. In 2018 he curated the Robert Kennedy - Martin Luther King, Jr. exhibition for the New York Historical Society. He also managed the 2020 Centennial of Ray Bradbury.

Schiller resides in Newtown, Pennsylvania with his wife Nina Wiener, the Editor in Chief of The Mayo Clinic Press.

Works

Filmography
Double Jeopardy (1992) Producer/Director
I Love My Friends (1985 Kris Kardashian music video) Director
The Man Who Skied Down Everest (1975 documentary) USA Director
Lenny (1974) Material supplier
Soon There Will Be No More Me (1972 documentary) Producer/Director
Lady Sings The Blues (1972) Titles/Still montage director
The American Dreamer (1971 documentary) Producer/Co-director/Writer
The Lexington Experience (1971 documentary) Producer/Director
Butch Cassidy and the Sundance Kid (1969) Still montage director

Books
Books - as author or in collaboration with:
LSD  (WS Press, 2023) Commemorative Edition by Richard Alpert aka Rom Dass, Sidney Cohen and Lawrence Schiller
All of Me Is Illustrated (RosettaBooks/Inked 2020) With stories by Ray Bradbury, tattoos by today's artists. Conceived and directed by Lawrence Schiller
The Fire Next Time (Taschen Books 2018) By James Baldwin with photos by Steve Schapiro and conceived by Lawrence Schiller
The Promise and the Dream, The Untold Story of MLK and RFK (RosettaBooks 2018) By David Margolick and produced by Lawrence Schiller
Electric Kool Aid Acid Test (Taschen 2017) By Tom Wolfe and photos by Lawrence Schiller
JFK: A Vision for America (HarperCollins 2017) Produced by Lawrence Schiller, Edited by Stephen Kennedy Smith & Douglas Brinkley 
Around the World in 125 Years (Taschen/National Geographic 2017) Photos by various photographers and conceived by Lawrence Schiller 
Barbra Streisand (Taschen Books 2014) by Steve Schapiro & Lawrence Schiller
Marilyn & Me, A Photographer's Memories (Nan A. Talese/Doubleday 2012) by Lawrence Schiller
Superman Comes to the Supermarket (Taschen Books 2012) By Norman Mailer with various photographers and conceived by Lawrence Schiller
Moonfire (Taschen Books 2009) By Norman Mailer with various photographers and conceived by Lawrence Schiller
Into the Mirror: The Life of Master Spy Robert P. Hanssen (HarperCollins 2002) by Lawrence Schiller
Cape May Court House: A Death in the Night (HarperCollins 2002) by Lawrence Schiller
Perfect Murder, Perfect Town: JonBenet and the City of Boulder (HarperCollins 1999) by Lawrence Schiller
American Tragedy: The Uncensored Story of the Simpson Defense (Random House 1996) by Lawrence Schiller and James Willwerth
I Want to Tell You — My Response to Your Letters, Your Messages, Your Questions (Little Brown 1995) by O. J. Simpson with Lawrence Schiller
Oswald's Tale: An American Mystery (Random House 1996) by Norman Mailer
The Executioner's Song (Hutchinson & Co. 1979) by Norman Mailer
The Faith of Graffiti (HarperCollins 2009) by Norman Mailer and Jon Naar
Marilyn: A Biography (Grosset and Dunlap 1973) by Norman Mailer and the world's foremost photographers
Ladies and Gentlemen Lenny Bruce!! (Random House 1974) by Albert Goldman and Lawrence Schiller
The Killing of Sharon Tate (New American Library 1970) by Susan Atkins and Lawrence Schiller
LSD (New American Library 1966) by Richard Alpert, Sidney Cohen and Lawrence Schiller

Television
Dead Man Talking The Gary Gilmore story, (Reelz Network) Executive Producer
Overkill The JonBenet Story (Reelz Network) Executive Producer
The Secret Tapes of the O. J. Case: The Untold Story, O. J. Speaks: The Hidden Tapes (LMN & A&E Networks, 2015) Executive Producer
JonBenet: Anatomy of a Cold Case (Court TV, 2006) Executive Producer/Director
Trace Evidence: The Case Files of Dr. Henry Lee (Court TV, 2004, 2005) Executive Producer/Director
Master Spy: The Robert Hanssen Story (CBS, 2002) Producer/Director
American Tragedy (CBS, 2000) Producer/Director/Writer (based on Schiller's book American Tragedy)
Perfect Murder, Perfect Town (CBS, 2000) Producer/Director (based on Schiller's book Perfect Murder, Perfect Town)
The Plot to Kill Hitler (Warner Bros./CBS, 1990) Director
Double Exposure: The Story of Margaret Bourke-White (TNT, 1989) Producer/Director
Peter the Great (NBC, 1986) Executive Producer/Co-director
Recipient of 3 Emmy Awards, Writers Guild of America Award
The Executioner's Song (NBC, 1982) Producer/Director
Recipient of 2 Emmy Awards, Time Magazine, Best of the Year, Hollywood Reporter, Best of the Decade
Murder: By Reason of Insanity (CBS, 1985) Producer
Her Life as a Man (NBC, 1986) Executive Producer
The Patricia Neal Story (CBS, 1982) Executive Producer
Recipient of 1 Emmy Award
Child Bride of Short Creek (NBC, 1982) Co-Producer
Marilyn, The Untold Story (ABC, 1980) Producer/Co-director
Recipient of 1 Emmy Award
The Winds of Kitty Hawk (NBC, 1978) Producer/Flying sequences and montages director
The Trial of Lee Harvey Oswald (ABC, 1976) Producer
Hey, I'm Alive (ABC, 1975) Producer/Director

Selected awards and recognitions
Academy of Television Arts and Sciences Emmy Award Winner for Peter the Great
The Christopher Award for The Patricia Neal Story
Representative of the US in the USA/USSR bilateral talks in Moscow and Washington, drafted and signed treaties with the Government of the USSR
Representative from the United States to the Moscow International Peace Forum
Numerous National Press Photographers Association Photographic Awards

References

External links
Norman Mailer Center Homepage
Lawrence Schiller Homepage
Lawrence Schiller App

1936 births
Living people
People from Brooklyn
American male journalists
Jewish American artists
20th-century American Jews
Film producers from New York (state)
American male screenwriters
Mountaineering film directors
Journalists from New York City
Film directors from New York City
Screenwriters from New York (state)
21st-century American Jews